Carpinone is a comune (municipality) in the Province of Isernia in the Italian region Molise, located about  west of Campobasso and about  east of Isernia.

Carpinone borders the following municipalities: Castelpetroso, Frosolone, Isernia, Macchiagodena, Pesche, Pettoranello del Molise, Santa Maria del Molise, Sessano del Molise.

Demographic evolution

References

Cities and towns in Molise